Ezra Ellsworth Burnham (4 April 1947 – 17 February 1973) was a Barbadian sprinter. He competed in the men's 400 metres at the 1968 Summer Olympics. He was killed in a car accident in North Carolina in 1973.

References

1947 births
1973 deaths
Athletes (track and field) at the 1968 Summer Olympics
Barbadian male sprinters
Olympic athletes of Barbados
Athletes (track and field) at the 1966 British Empire and Commonwealth Games
Commonwealth Games competitors for Barbados
Road incident deaths in North Carolina
Place of birth missing